Vlasta Štěpová (born 7 June 1938) is a Czech former politician and economist. She was the Czechoslovak Minister of Trade and Tourism in the Federation between 1989 and 1992, as part of the cabinet of firstly František Pitra, then Petr Pithart. She was elected as a member of the Civic Forum to the Czech National Council in June 1990. After spending some time with the Civic Movement (Občanské hnutí), she joined the Social Democratic Party in March 1994. In 1996 she was elected to the Chamber of Deputies of the Parliament of the Czech Republic.

References

1938 births
Czechoslovak economists
Czech women economists
People from Ústí nad Orlicí District
Prague University of Economics and Business alumni
Czech Social Democratic Party MPs
Government ministers of Czechoslovakia
Living people
Civic Movement Government ministers
Members of the Chamber of Deputies of the Czech Republic (1996–1998)
Members of the Chamber of Deputies of the Czech Republic (1998–2002)